The Papua New Guinea national under-20 football team is the national U-20 team of Papua New Guinea and is controlled by the Papua New Guinea Football Association. PMRL Stadium, which has a capacity of 15,000, is used for home games.

History
The Papua New Guinea national under-20 football team took part in the OFC U-20 Championship tournament 13 times (1978, 1980, 1982, 1985, 1988, 1992, 1994, 2001, 2002, 2011, 2013, 2014 and 2016) and their best results were in 1978 and 1982 when the team achieved fourth place both times.

Competition record

OFC
The OFC Under 20 Qualifying Tournament is a tournament held once every two years to decide the two qualification spots for the Oceania Football Confederation (OFC) and its representatives at the FIFA U-20 World Cup.

FIFA U-20 World Cup

Fixtures and results

Current technical staff

Current squad
The following players were called up for the 2022 OFC U-19 Championship from 7 to 20 September 2022. Names in italics denote players who have been capped for the Senior team.

Caps and goals as of 1 September 2022 before the game against Fiji.

2018 squad
The following players have been called up for the 2018 OFC U-19 Championship from 5 to 18 August 2018. Names in italics denote players who have been capped for the Senior team.

Caps and goals as of 12 August 2018 after the game against New Zealand.

References

External links
Papua New Guinea Football Association official website

under-20
Oceanian national under-20 association football teams